is a Japanese football player, currently playing for Ehime FC in the J2 League.

Club statistics
Updated to 23 February 2018.

References

External links

Profile at Ehime FC

1989 births
Living people
Association football people from Osaka Prefecture
People from Suita
Japanese footballers
J1 League players
J2 League players
J3 League players
Gamba Osaka players
Giravanz Kitakyushu players
Tokyo Verdy players
Gainare Tottori players
Ehime FC players
Association football midfielders